The Adam Smith Prizes are prizes currently awarded for the best overall examination performance and best dissertation in Part IIB of the Economics Tripos (the graduation examination for economics undergraduates) at the University of Cambridge. The prize - named after Scottish philosopher and economist Adam Smith - was originally established in 1891 and awarded triennially for the best submitted essay on a subject of the writer's choice.

List of past recipients
 1894 Arthur Lyon Bowley
 1897 Frederick Pethick-Lawrence, 1st Baron Pethick-Lawrence
 1900 Sydney Chapman
 1903 Arthur Cecil Pigou
 1906 Ernest Alfred Benians
 1909 John Maynard Keynes
 1929 R. F. Kahn
 1930 Ruth Cohen
 1932 K. S. Isles
 1933 B. P. Adarkar
 1935 W. B. Reddaway
 1936 D. G. Champernowne
 1954 Amartya Sen
 1956 Manmohan Singh
 1974 Martin Osborne
 1987 Richard J. Parkin
 2000 Saugato Datta and Richard Fearon
 2006 Mark Shields
 2007 Stefanie Stantcheva
 2008 Thomas Mckendrick and Shivam Patel
 2009 Praneet Shah
2011 Ossie Akushie and Shafi Anwar
 2013 Inna Grinis and Ivan Kuznetsov
 2014 James Walker
 2015 Ben Andrews and Jonathon Hazell
 2016 Isar Bhattacharjee and Toni Oki
 2017 Joel Flynn and Joseph Lee
 2018 Tireni Ajilore, George Nikolakoudis, Laurence O’Brien and Sajan Shah
 2019 Vlastimil Rasocha and Kuishuai Yi
 2020 Neal Patel, David Lee, Liam Grant, Andrew Koh and Michael Bennett
 2021 Valerie Chuang, Matthew Chen and Jack Golden

See also

 List of economics awards

References

Economics awards
Awards and prizes of the University of Cambridge
Student awards